Candy Gourlay (formerly Candy Quimpo) is a Filipino author based in the United Kingdom who has been shortlisted for the Carnegie Medal.

Biography
Candy Gourlay was born and raised in the Philippines.

Career

Author
Her debut novel Tall Story (2010)  won the National Children's Book Award of the Philippines in 2012 and the Crystal Kite Award for Europe in 2011. Tall Story was shortlisted for 13 prizes, notably: the Waterstones Children's Book Prize, the Branford Boase Award, the Blue Peter Book Award and the UKLA Children's Book Prize. It was nominated for the Carnegie Medal. Her second novel Shine (2013) was longlisted for the Guardian Children's Fiction Prize and won the Crystal Kite Award for the British Isles in 2014. Bone Talk (2018) was shortlisted for the Costa Book Awards and the CILIP Carnegie Medal.

Journalist
From 1984 to 1989, she worked as a journalist in the Philippines, notably as a staffwriter and later associate editor of the weekly opposition tabloid Mr & Ms Special Edition, which played a significant role in the overthrow of the 21 year regime of Filipino dictator Ferdinand Marcos.

Her other positions include:
1984, staff writer, Mr & Ms Special Edition (Manila)
1985, associate editor, Mr & Ms Special Edition (Manila)
1986, desk editor, Philippine Daily Inquirer (Manila)
1987, correspondent, Asia Magazine (Manila)
1989, staff writer, Marketing Magazine (London)
1990, London correspondent, Inter Press Service (London) 
2005, presenter and writer, Motherless Nation, BBC Radio 4 documentary on the social impact of Philippine migration

Published books
 Hinabing Gunita (Woven Memories): Filipinos in the United Kingdom (London: Centre for Filipinos, 2004)
 Animal Tricksters (Oxford University Press, 2010) – "Oxford reading tree. Stage 10, Treetops myths and legends" .
 Tall Story (Oxford: David Fickling Books, 2010)
 Shine (David Fickling, 2013)
 Bone Talk (David Fickling, 2018)

References

External links
 Interview with Mirrors Windows Doors, August 2014
 Review of Shine by Philip Ardagh, January 2014
 
 Candy Gourlay's website March 2022

1962 births
Living people
Visayan people
People from Davao City
British children's writers
Filipino children's writers
Filipino women writers
Filipino writers
Writers from Davao del Sur
Filipino journalists
Filipino women journalists
Filipino bloggers
Filipino women bloggers
British women children's writers
British bloggers
British women bloggers
Filipino emigrants to the United Kingdom
Ateneo de Manila University alumni
Naturalised citizens of the United Kingdom